Chelyocarpus dianeurus is a species of flowering plant in the family Arecaceae. The palm tree is endemic to Colombia.  It is found in the Pacific lowlands of the country, occurring on well-drained soils. It is a single-stemmed (trunked) palm. Leaf sheath fibre is used locally for pillow stuffing.

References

 Current IUCN Red List of all Threatened Species

dianeurus
Endemic flora of Colombia
Trees of Colombia
Near threatened flora of South America
Taxonomy articles created by Polbot
Taxa named by Max Burret